Krishnanagar is a village in Belgaum district in Karnataka, India. It had a population of 600 as of the 2011 Indian census.

References

Villages in Belagavi district